The Spectrum is a daily newspaper based in St. George, Utah.

In February, 2018 Melissa Galbraith, a journalist and Utah native who had worked previously for the Arizona Republic, including as assistant news editor, replaced Steve Kiggins as editor.

In 2000, Toronto based Thomson Corporation sold The Spectrum to Gannett.

References

External links
 

Newspapers published in Utah
Spectrum